Wade Harper (born 1963/1964) is an American politician, the former mayor of Antioch, California. He is the first African American to be elected as mayor.

Biography
Harper was born and raised in Oakland, California, the youngest of three children. His mother was a single mom who remarried a Vietnam veteran who gave him a disciplined upbringing. In 1988, Harper accepted a position as a police dispatcher in Emeryville, California later rising to the rank of sergeant and then in 2005, as a police officer in Tracy, California. rising to the rank of lieutenant. He graduated with a B.A. in pastoral studies from Patten University and an M.B.A. from John F. Kennedy University. In 2001, he moved to Antioch. In 2009, he was appointed to the Antioch Unified School District’s Board of Trustees. In 2010, he won a 4-year term on the City Council, the second African-American to serve on the council after Reggie Moore, who was elected in 2006 reflecting Antioch's growing Black population which had increased from 10% in 2000 to 17% in 2010. In 2012, running on a zero tolerance platform, he won election as mayor succeeding James Davis. He was the first African-American mayor of Antioch in its 162 year history. As the mayorship, unlike the City Council, was a full-time position, he also retired from his job as a police lieutenant in Tracy. In January 2015, an unsuccessful recall effort was launched against him due to concerns over the still high levels of violent and property crime. In the November 8, 2016 general election, he was narrowly defeated for re-election by a margin of 67 votes by Sean Wright.

Personal life

Harper is an anointed preacher. He is married to Lisa Harper; they have two children.
Wade Harper is a published authored. He published his first book in 2018, “Anointed for Leadership: Lessons from Law Enforcement and Pastoral Ministry.” He published his second book in 2021 entitled, “Keep Antioch Beautiful.”

In November of 2020 Wade accepting a position as CEO of a non-profit, Glad Tidings Community Development Corporation in Hayward, CA.

References

1960s births
Living people
African-American mayors in California
21st-century African-American people